Drach is a surname. Notable people with the surname include:

 David Paul Drach (1791–1868), Alsatian-Catican Roman Catholic librarian of Jewish descent
 Eduard Drach (born 1965)
 George E. Drach (1906-1966), American politician and lawyer
 Ivan Drach (born 1936), Ukrainian poet, screenwriter, literary critic and politician
 Michel Drach (1930–1990), French film director, writer, producer and actor
 Vanja Drach (1932–2009), Croatian theatre and film actor

See also 
 Cuevas del Drach, caves of Majorca, Balearic Islands, Spain
 The Caves of Drach, a juvenile science fiction novel
 Dj Drach, a dj from tehran ali drach 

 Dj Drach, a dj from tehran ali drach 
German-language surnames
Jewish surnames